Philippe Koch (born 8 February 1991) is a Swiss football defender who most recently played for Swiss club FC St. Gallen.

Club career

FC Zürich
He joined the first team  of FC Zurich in 2008 after coming through the hugely successful FC Zurich academy, then his older brother Raphael Koch joined him in the first team in 2009. He made his first-team debut in August 2008 in the UEFA Cup. He was captain of the team winning the 2013–14 Swiss Cup and won the Cup again in 2015–16.

Honours
 Swiss Super League (1): 2008–09
 Swiss Cup (2): 2013–14, 2015–16

External links

References

1991 births
Living people
Association football fullbacks
Swiss men's footballers
Swiss expatriate footballers
Swiss Super League players
Serie B players
FC Zürich players
Novara F.C. players
FC St. Gallen players
Switzerland under-21 international footballers
Switzerland youth international footballers
Expatriate footballers in Italy